Windham Bay is located  southeast of Juneau, in the U.S. state of Alaska. Windham Bay is listed as site 6 within Southeast Alaska's Zone 3 of the Alaska Dept. of Environmental Conservation's Geographic Response Strategy oil spill response plan . The Chuck River flows into Windham Bay, which has a protected anchorage north of Port Houghton, where the historic Chuck Mining Camp once operated.

History
The earliest gold production in Alaska occurred in Windham Bay and Sumdum Bay in 1870-71 subsequent to an 1869 gold placer deposit discovery at the two locations. It consisted of nine claims known as the "Red Wing" group.

Geography
A sheltered tidal flat, the bay habitat consists of marshy land and estuaries. At the head of the bay is an extensive tide flat.

The settlement known as Windham is situated on the northeast side of the bay.

Geology
Its headwaters enter the schist band, the rocks of which are likewise exposed along the south shore of Endicott Arm. At the head of the bay is a band of slate which appears to continue over the divide to Sanford Cove and southward up the valley of Chuck River. West of the slate beds is a slate-greenstone belt composing the shore bluffs at the entrance of Windham Bay. Several outlying masses of diorite intrude into the inlet.

Flora and fauna

The river stretch from its headwaters down to the bay is thickly forested riparian forest vegetation. The Chuck River Wilderness, located at the head of the Bay, was established in 1990 under a directive of the United States Congress. It encompasses an area of  entirely within Alaska and is managed by the Forest Service.

Marine mammals found here and which are protected include harbor seals, salmon and trout (coastal cutthroat trout) concentrations. The salmon species reported are sockeye, pink, coho, chum and chinook salmon, steelhead, and Dolly Varden trout. Water fowl concentrations are reported during winter months. Black bears, wolves and mountain goats are reported in the mountainous regions of the valley.

References
This article contains public domain text from A.C. Spencer's "The Juneau gold belt, Alaska: A reconnaissance of Admiralty Island, Alaska" (1906)

Bays of Alaska
Bays of Hoonah–Angoon Census Area, Alaska